La Iruela is a town located in the province of Jaén, Andalusia, Spain. It sits on a peak of the Sierra de Cazorla and is home to the ruins of an 11th-century Moorish, and later Templar, fortress which towers over the road from Cazorla to the Sierras de Cazorla, Segura y Las Villas Natural Park. According to the 2005 census (INE), the city has a population of 1894 inhabitants.

References

Municipalities in the Province of Jaén (Spain)